Abdul Karim Brahui (born 1955, in Chahar Burjak District, Nimruz Province) is a former politician in Afghanistan. He last served as Governor of Nimroz Province from 2010 to 2012, and before that he served as a minister in the Cabinet of Afghanistan.  From February 2009 to August 2010, Brahui served as Minister of Refugees. In 2004, Brahui was appointed as Minister of Borders and Tribal Affairs.

Early years

Brahui was born in the Pedehgee village of Chahar Burjak District of Nimruz Province in 1955. He is the son of Mohammad Mobin and belongs to the Mohammad Hassani tribe, minority ethnic group of Afghanistan. He attended primary school in his hometown and graduated from Cadet School in 1973. He then attended Cadet College where he obtained his bachelor's degree in 1977 in the field of Weapons Technology and served in the military of Afghanistan. After the Soviet invasion of Afghanistan, he left the military as many others did and joined the mujahideen alliance.

Mujahideen commander and politician

During the 1980s he was a mujahideen commander leading the Nimruz Front.

Following the collapse of Najibullah's government, Brahui was appointed as Governor of Nimruz and the Commander of the 4th Brigade in the government of Burhanuddin Rabbani. 

When the Taliban under Mullah Omar took control of Nimruz in 1995, Brahui and his troops fled to neighboring Baluchistan Province of Iran. At that point Hamidullah Niyazmand became governor of the province. During the Afghan Interim Administration, Brahui was again appointed as the Governor of Nimruz and Commander of 4th Brigade.

In early 2009, militants attempted to kill Brahui in a suicide attack. In early 2011, Brahui again escaped unhurt in a remote-controlled bomb explosion. He was visiting an irrigation project on the Lashkari canal when his vehicle was hit with a remote control mine in the 2nd district of Zaranj, near the Darul Ulam Madrasa (Islamic school) in the city.

Governor of Nimroz province

Mr. Brahui is the oldest governor in Nimroz province who has served in this position for four terms. Commencement of Kamal Khan dam, electricity supply to Zaranj city from Iran, creation of a new town in Chakhansur district, security of Zaranj-Delaram highway, reconstruction of Lashkari irrigation channel (supplying agricultural water to Zaranj and Kang), creation of de-addiction camp (free) for patients Narcotics is one of the important tasks of Mr. Brahui during his tenure as the governor of Nimroz.

See also
List of current provincial governors in Afghanistan

References

External links

Zaranj shows promise for future of Nimroz province (By Cpl. Timothy L. Solano, Dec. 7, 2011)

Governors of Nimruz Province
Mujahideen members of the Soviet–Afghan War
Brahui people
Living people
1955 births